Viejas may refer to:

 Viejas Group of Capitan Grande Band of Mission Indians, a federally recognized Native American tribe
 Viejas Casino, Alpine, California, United States, a hotel-casino owned by the tribe
 Viejas Mountain, California
 Viejas Valley, California
 Viejas Arena, a sports and music venue on the San Diego State University campus

See also
 Vieja, a genus of fish
 La Vieja River, Colombia
 Mission Vieja, the first Spanish mission in the San Gabriel Valley, California